Willie White may refer to:

 Willie White (basketball) (born 1962), American basketball player
 Willie White (footballer, born 1895) (1895–1974), Scottish footballer
 Willie White (footballer, born 1932) (1932–2015), Scottish footballer
 Willie White, fictional character from the television series Doug
 Willye White (1939–2007), American track and field athlete

See also
 Will White (1854–1911), American baseball player
 William White (disambiguation)
 Billy White (disambiguation)